Robert Warren Williams, known as Bo Williams (July 21, 1938 – September 29, 2022), was a Republican former mayor of Shreveport, Louisiana, having served a single term from 1994 to 1998.

In 1990, Williams was elected to a single term on the Shreveport City Council from District E. He received 6,293 votes (53 percent) to Democrat John L. Albritton's 5,503 ballots (47 percent). He left the council after one term to become mayor.

In the 1994 election Williams defeated his fellow city council member, Democrat Roy Cary, an African-American, by 38,596 votes (59 percent) to 27,018 (41 percent). Although eligible, the incumbent mayor, Hazel Beard, elected not to run for re-election. Eliminated in the nonpartisan blanket primary was the Democratic former Mayor John Brennan Hussey.

As his chief administrative officer, Mayor Williams chose Wendell Fraser Collins, a native of Many in Sabine Parish and a former long-term employee of AT&T. During his tenure, Williams pushed for the completion of Interstate 49, the north–south link from Shreveport to Lafayette. Former Shreveport mayor Jim Gardner claims that I-49 was not a priority of Governor Mike Foster, the Republican who served from 1996 to 2004.

Williams was physically impaired as mayor. He used a wheelchair as a result of an accident several years earlier and had limited upper-body movement. In his memoirs entitled Jim Gardner and Shreveport, Vol. II, Gardner describes Williams as follows:

I came to realize that most Shreveporters did not comprehend the physical limitations of the mayor. This was to handicap him politically as he could not be as physically visible as the citizens were accustomed . ... and this was sometimes interpreted as lack of activity. ... Mayor Williams compensated for his physical limitations by his study of city government. He knew his facts and figures: he did his homework. ... A very pleasant man, he was always especially gracious to former mayors. Invitations were forthcoming to us for dedication type ceremonies. This included his election opponent, Mayor Hussey.

In the 1998 Shreveport mayoral election, Williams ran in second place in the first round and withdrew from a pending general election. Democratic candidate Keith Paul Hightower, the District C council member from southeast Shreveport, led with 20,250 votes (42 percent) to Williams' 13,637 (28 percent). Three other candidates, two Democrats and another Republican, divided the remaining 30 percent of the ballots. Williams, who trailed by nearly 7,000 votes, declined to proceed to a second round of balloting, and Hightower hence won the position outright. Hightower served two terms.

Williams resided with his wife, Melba Clark (born 1939) in Shreveport.

References 

http://www.sos.louisiana.gov:8090/cgibin/?rqstyp=elcpr&rqsdta=11069009
http://www.sos.louisiana.gov:8090/cgibin/?rqstyp=elcpr&rqsdta=11089409

Louisiana Republicans
1938 births
Living people
Louisiana city council members
Mayors of Shreveport, Louisiana
American politicians with disabilities
People with paraplegia